Club Atlético San Telmo is an Argentine sports club located in the neighbourhood of San Telmo, in the City of Buenos Aires. The club is mostly known for its football team, which currently plays in Primera Nacional, the second division of the Argentine football league system.

Apart from football, other sports practised at San Telmo are basketball, boxing, field hockey, futsal, handball, martial arts, and artistic roller skating.

History

The club was founded as "San Telmo Football Club" on March 5, 1904, by Francisco Pantarotto who would be also its first president. The first headquarters were located on Paseo Colón Avenue of Buenos Aires. San Telmo had several venues located in Puerto Madero until the club built its first stadium on Juan de Garay street in San Telmo district where the club took its name from.

The first jerseys were blue and white. In the first official match of the club, the rain made the colour blue to fade until it covered the white part of the jerseys in a light-blue tone. From then on, the club adopted the blue and light blue as its official colors.

In 1916 the team affiliated to Argentine Football Association and won the Segunda División de Ascenso tournament. In the 1920s the club changed its team to "Club Atlético San Telmo" which has remained to date. In 1926 and due to the lack of a deed of sale, San Telmo had to move to Isla Maciel in Dock Sud district of Greater Buenos Aires. The club inaugurated its own stadium there three years later. The first title won by San Telmo was 1949 Primera C but due to a restructuring of the Argentine league system, the squad did not promote to the upper division.

In 1975 San Telmo finished third in Primera B, therefore the team qualified to play the playoffs to promote to Primera División, which finally achieved. Although being promoted to the first division, San Telmo would be relegated in the next season. Nevertheless, the team that played in the top level during 1976 wrote a memorable page in the history of the club on May 25, 1976 when it defeated Boca Juniors by 3–1 at Huracán's stadium.

Stadium
San Telmo's stadium is named Dr. Osvaldo Baletto and is located in the Isla Maciel of Dock Sud, Avellaneda Partido. It was closed from February 11, 2006 due to violent incidents in a match against Talleres (BA), which caused that San Telmo had to play its home games at the Estadio Alfredo Ramos, Club Comunicaciones's venue.

In October, 2011, and after six year of being closed, the stadium was reopened to host the match between the local team and Almagro which ended 0–0.

Players

Current squad

As of 31 July 2022.

Out on loan

Honours
Primera C
Champions (4): 1949, 1956, 1961, 2015

References

External links

 

s
S
S
S
S